The 2008 WAC men's basketball tournament, a part of the 2007-08 NCAA Division I men's basketball season, was held  at the Pan American Center in Las Cruces, New Mexico. 

Four teams finished the season at 12–4 in the conference standings, and all advanced to the semifinals. In the championship game, Boise State defeated host New Mexico State in triple overtime and received the Western Athletic Conference's automatic bid to the NCAA tournament. It was the Broncos' first NCAA appearance in fourteen years, when they won the Big Sky tournament (as a fifth-seed). 

Boise State was seeded fourteenth in the East region and lost to Louisville in the first round.

Utah State made the National Invitation Tournament (NIT), but lost a road game in the first round.

Tournament

Bracket

References

External links
Official website of the Western Athletic Conference
WAC Men's Basketball Tournament

WAC men's basketball tournament
Tournament
WAC men's basketball tournament
WAC men's basketball tournament